is a Japanese manga series written and illustrated by the Fujiko Fujio duo (and later by Fujiko A. Fujio) which was serialized between 1964 and 1988. It was later adapted into a television drama that aired on TV Asahi from 1966 – 1968; an anime series by Shin-Ei Animation, airing on Asahi from 1981 – 1987; a video game by Hudson Soft; four anime films by Shin-Ei and a live-action film. A remake of the 1981 anime series produced by Shin-Ei and the Indian animation firms Reliance MediaWorks and later Green Gold Animations has aired since 2013.

Plot 
10-year-old Kenichi Mitsuba is an average kid who goes to secondary school and struggles with his studies. He is very stubborn and lazy, therefore always ending up frustrating his parents and teachers. He loves to find an easy way out of everything much to the annoyance of Hattori.

Meanwhile, a young ninja named Kanzo Hattori becomes best friends with Kenichi. Hattori becomes a part of the Mitsuba family along with his brother Shinzo and his ninja dog, Shishimaru. Hattori helps Kenichi with his problems, constantly keeping an eye on him as a good friend. Yumeko is portrayed as Kenichi's love interest.

The main antagonists are Kemumaki, a Koga Ninja, and his ninja-cat, Kagechiyo. Kemaki always causes trouble for Kenichi and Hattori, sometimes inventing new devices to fight against Hattori but always ending up in mishap. Kenichi asking Hattori to take revenge is a recurring storyline present throughout many episodes. Although Hattori is a good friend, Kenichi sometimes fights with him due to misunderstandings created by Kemumaki. Sometimes Jippou, Togejirou and Tsubame help him.

There are five main locations in the series: Tokyo City, Shinto Temple, Iga Province, Iga Mountains, and Kōga Valley.

Characters

Main characters
  
 (voice: Junko Hori; drama actor: Kōtoku Nomura, drama voice: Kazuo Imakura, live-action film actor: Shingo Katori) 
Hattori-kun, is the protagonist of the series, a little ninja who is named after his ancestor Hattori Hanzō. He is 11 years old and a skilled ninja despite his age who left his home in Iga to train in Tokyo, where he took up residence in the Mitsuba household. The show follows his many adventures and daily life living in modern Japan and his friendship with Kenichi Mitsuba. Both boys find a rival in Kemaki (Kemumaki in some dubs), another young ninja in Kenichi's class. Hattori-kun's main weakness is that he is terrified of frogs (Ranidaphobia) . He has strong beliefs on what makes a good ninja and reminds everyone of the same. Hattori-kun has signature swirls on his cheeks, wears a blue head covering at all times, and also has a quirk of saying ~degozaru or nin nin (ding ding in dubs) after almost every sentence. Hattori-kun has an ardent admirer, Tsubame. He wears blue coloured ninja robes with a red belt. 

  
 (voice: Yūko Mita (1980s anime), Yukiko Hinata (2012 anime); drama actor: Shigeki Nakajō)
Shinzo is Kanzo's five-year-old younger brother who followed him to Tokyo. Being only an apprentice ninja he uses wooden weapons. His older brother Hattori is his role model. He can cry extremely loudly, stunning people and even causing them to faint. He helps Kanzo fight Kemaki, sometimes using  his loud crying to immobilise opponents. He wears red coloured ninja robes. His catchphrase is "shin shin.

  
 (voice: Masako Sugaya (1980s series), Tomomi Tenjinbayashi (2012 series); drama actor: Katsumi Takamiya, live-action film actor: Yuri Chinen)
A 10-year-old middle schooler who doesn't have much academic or athletic talent but enjoys photography. His greatest desire is to win the affections of classmate Yumeko, in the process of which he often gets into trouble with his rival Kemaki and convinces the hesitant Hattori to help him. He is not above tricking Hattori into lending a hand. Kenichi wears glasses and a cap.

Recurring characters
  
 (voice: Runa Akiyama (1980s series), Haruka Sato (2012 anime))
Yumeko-chan, is a classmate and friend of Kenichi's. Both Kenichi and Kemaki have unrequited crushes on her, causing a rivalry between the two boys. Yumeko sees Hattori and Shinzo as brothers. She is a pianist and hates bell peppers. Yumeko appears in an episode of Perman as a cousin of Michiko. She wears a pink long sleeved dress and has her hair in a short cut with bangs. 

 
 (voice: Kenichi Ogata)
Is a ninja dog living with Kenichi, who came along with Kanzo and Shinzo Hattori. He is often lazy and stubborn. Along with Shinzo, the two of them wind up doing mischief and creating trouble. He has an attack technique of turning in a fireball when provoked. He also has the ability to change form into any other animal. His fur is curly and yellow. Shishimaru's ninja mark on his forehead is very important for him as it is an identification of him as a ninja. He loves to eat all kinds of delicious treats, especially a fish sausage, or chocolate roll.

 
 (voice: Kaneta Kimotsuki (1980s series), Kazuki Ogawa (2012 series), live-action film actor: Gorie)
Is the antagonist of Ninja Hattori-kun. The 11-year-old ninja comes from the Koga village and hence is a sworn rival of the Iga native Hattoris. He lives alone in a small apartment with his ninja cat Kagechiyo. As per the Koga rules, his ninja identity is a secret, with only Kenichi and the Hattoris knowing about his dual life while he attends middle school as a normal student. His parents' whereabouts are unknown, but his mother is noted several times in the series, and once visited him while he was sleeping to cook him a meal. Kemaki is shorter than Kenichi but much better at school and sports than him. He isn't as good a ninja as Hattori-kun but never gives up trying to beat him. Despite being the main antagonist, he is actually a nice but lonely boy who sometimes helps out his rivals. Kemaki strongly adheres to his clan rules of never using ninjutsu for criminal acts, going so far as to temporarily excommunicate Kagechiyo for stealing an ice cream. He wears green colored ninja robes, is brown skinned and has his hair is a short ponytail.
He is called Amara in the Hindi dub, but retains his name in the Indian English and regional language dubs.

  
 (voice: Eiko Yamada (1980s series), Ai Fukada (2012 anime))
Is a talking animal-ninja of the Kōga-ryū, Kagechiyo is the supporting antagonist in the series. Usually Kemumaki gives a big task in his plans for Kagechiyo to carry out, which he often does not succeed in. This is because he doesn't get enough training from Kemumaki and is seen sleeping on the streets. He is noticed by Hattori several times. He is seen to have a rivalry with Shishimaru. His fur color is black and white. He normally hides in the Mitsuba house to hear Kenichi and his friends' plans and afterwards informs Kemumaki about them, we'll suited to being a spy. At times he resents Kemumaki for his strictness and imagines living a life of luxury as a normal cat in some episodes. He enjoys eating fish. He obtains an attack of static electricity on rubbing a shining metal plate against his back. If he uses this attack too much then it will drain his energy, and he will feel weak.
He is called Kiyo or Keo in the Indian versions.

  
 (voice: Yōko Kawanami and Unknown)
One of Kenichi's teachers. Koike-sensei has a crush on her. The subject she teaches is unknown. Though in many episodes she is shown teaching the class music.

  
 (voice: Issei Futamata)
Kenichi's teacher, also appears as a ramen chef in Obake no Q-tarō and sometimes appear as a cameo in Doraemon where he eats ramen. He frequently scolds Kenichi similar to when Nobita is scolded by his teacher in Doraemon. He is caricatured after animator Shin'ichi Suzuki. He also appears in the cartoon "Biriken" and "Ultra B" as Michio's father.

  
 (voice: Yuzuru Fujimoto (1980s anime) Eiji Yanagisawa (2012 anime); drama actor: Teizō Muta)
Kenichi's father. He usually smokes and comes from his office late in the evening. He likes eating and golf a lot. Though a rather plump man, in some of the episodes, his size seems to change, going from stouter to slimmer. He gave Kenichi his name, hoping for his son's good health. 

 Taeko Mitsuba(三葉 妙子)
 (voice: Yukiko Nashiwa (1980s series), Miwa Kitahara (2012 anime); drama actor: Chiharu Kuri)
The mother of Kenichi. She is a slim housewife who is busy keeping order of a house inhabited by six, including Shinzo who often wets his futon. She likes Tsubame and thinks that Kemaki is a good boy (not knowing of his ninja identity and pranking habit). Kenichi constantly stresses her out with his bad grades and his preference for playing over studying, making her lecture him. She also appears in an episode of Doraemon, in one of Doraemon's dreams.

Other characters
 
 (voice: Reizō Nomoto and Unknown)
A professor who lives in the United States (USA) and invented Togejirou.

 
 (voice: Hiroko Maruyama and Unknown)
A cactus having supernatural powers is sent by Professor Shinobino from the United States. Shisimaru does not like Cacto-chan and loves to compete with him.
He is called Cacto-chan in the Indian English and Hindi dubbed versions.

  
 (voice: Fuyumi Shiraishi, Moses Chan - Cantonese-dubbed version aired on TVB)
A.k.a. Tsubame-ko, is a kunoichi and classmate of Hattori-kun. She likes Hattori and always wishes to marry him. She has a dislike for Kemumaki and Kagechiyo. She wears pink coloured ninja robes. She seems to own a recorder, a clarinet, a flute, a piccolo and a bassoon, five woodwind instruments.
She is called Sonam in the Indian version.

 Isa Yohi
A koga ninja girl who is a senior of Kemumaki and a frenemy of Hattori. First she start to fight Ninja Hattori. Later She also helps Hattori and His Friends. This character was appeared in 2012 Anime only.

 Robert
An american ninja who is a student of Ninja Hattori. He learns only wrong Ninja techniques. Later these become very useful to him.

 Saizo 
An iga ninja boy who tries to achieve primary school certification. His power is creating a cloud and using for a transportation.

 Gosuke
An iga ninja boy who tries to achieve Primary School Certification. His power is do anything within few seconds.

 Surasuke
An iga ninja boy who tries to achieve Primary School Certification. His power is speed.

 Old Grandma
Saizo Gosuke and Surasuke's adopted grandmother. She like them and take care him as grandsons. She also helps Hattori and Kenechi.

 Kittu
Kiyo's Little Brother Cat. Kittu likes Kiyo and thought as a Big Brother. Kittu uses Ninja techniques also. Kittu mostly appears in the 2012 anime.

 Momombe
An iga ninja squirrel who is a childhood friend of Shishimaru's. Momombe uses more ninja techniques than Shishimaru. Momombe mostly appears in the 2012 anime.

 Inspector
A sub-inspector of Mitoriquaika City. He likes Hattori because Hattori and his friends help him to catch the thieves. He mostly appears in 1981 anime.

  
 (voice: Tadao Futami and Unknown)
Hattori-kun and Shinzou's father. He also appear in Perman, when he fights with Perman.

  
 (voice: Junpei Takiguchi and Unknown, drama voice: Hiroko Maruyama)
A giant turtle monster ninja. He and Hattori are ninja partners.

 Tai-chan 
A baby who uses ninja techniques perfectly. He learned ninja techniques who taught by Hattori Kanzou. Tai-chan is mostly appeared in 2012 anime.

 Toko 
Yumeko's pet. Toko always likes Kenichi. So, it became a friend to Kenichi. Toko is appeared in 2012 anime.

 Mimicky
Kiyo's enemy and Kemumaki's old pet. He copies everyone for his hungry. He ate free food who given by his owner who copied by Mimicky.

 Ninja Eagle
An iga valley's messenger. It gives a message who was given by an iga valley's members to Hattori.

 Pet Teacher
Kenichi's pet teacher was appeared in few Episodes of 2012 Anime.

 Mokamaru
He is a high tech ninja. Hattori's old enemy. He uses computer ninja techniques to attack Hattori.
He appears in the movie Ninja Hattori-kun: Nin Nin Furusato Daisakusen no Maki (Ninja Hattori - Home Town).

 Green Frog
Kemumaki's pet. Kemumaki use this pet to beat Hattori's brave. Green frog is appeared in 2012 anime.

Media

Manga 
The first manga series was published in Kobunsha's Shōnen in 1964 and ended in 1968. A second manga series was published by Shogakukan in various kids magazines like CoroCoro Comic, Televi-Kun and others from 1981 to 1988.

Drama
It was made into a live-action TV drama. Aired from 1966 - 1968. This was a work of special effects sitcom. This drama was aired on TV Asahi and was divided into 2 seasons, first season aired from 7 April to 28 September 1966, second season aired from August 3, 1967 to January 25, 1968. Each season consists of 26 episodes, in total 52 episodes from 2 seasons.

Ninja Hattori (1966 drama, 1st Season)

Aired from 7 April to 28 September 1966, 26 episodes in total.

After graduating from ninja school, Hattori-kun, who went down to the lower world to train as a warrior, lives at the house of Kenichi-kun, whom he happened to meet.

Ninja Hattori-kun + Ninja Monster Zippo (1967 drama, 2nd Season) 
Aired from August 3, 1967 to January 25, 1968, 26 episodes in total.

Hattori, who felt lonely after returning to the mountains, became friends with Zippo, a ninja monster that appeared from a shooting star. She stays at Kun's house and causes a commotion. This was the first time when ninja monster Jippō appeared in Ninja Hattori-kun show.

Anime

1981 anime series 
The first anime series aired on TV Asahi in Japan from September 28, 1981 to December 25, 1987 for a total of 694 episodes and 11 special episodes, in total 705 episodes.

Amazon Prime Video India began streaming the series in English, Tamil, Telugu and Hindi in December 2016. Netflix began streaming the "fifth season" (53 episodes) of the Indian English dub in the United States, Canada, the United Kingdom, Australia, and India on December 22, 2018. Since May 15, 2020, Netflix no longer streams them. In Korea, from December 19, 2005, until the 5th season was aired on Talent TV (JEI Talent Broadcasting at the time of the first airing in 2005). became  Currently, Nickelodeon is broadcasting New Ninja Hattori. The main character, the ninja Hattori Ganjo Hanzo (Tori), has a distinctive dialect accent and a 'nin nin nin nin nin' tone.

In Vietnam, the series was re-released by POPS Kids on digital platforms and Youtube with a Vietnamese dub version by Purpose Media from 2018 and 2022.

2013 anime series 
In January 2012, Nikkei announced on its website that a remake of the anime series under production by Indian production company Reliance MediaWorks and Shin-Ei Animation. The announcement was part of a move to produce several remakes of popular anime television series to be broadcast across television stations in the Asian market to counteract Japan's stagnating domestic anime marketplace due to its declining birthrate. Shin-Ei Animation is currently collaborating with Green Gold Animation to produce new episodes of the series. Yūichi Nagata, producer at Shin-Ei Animation, stated that the current collaboration will be between Shin-Ei's "creative content" and Green Gold Animation's "quality of skills in animation making and diligence".

The new series began airing in India and Indonesia on May of the same year, as well as China. It premiered on Animax in Japan on May 13, 2013.

Netflix, initially set to stream the Indian English dub of the first two seasons in early 2019, began streaming them in the United States, Canada, the United Kingdom, Australia, and India on December 22, 2018. Since May 15, 2020, Netflix no longer streams them.

In Vietnam, the series continued to be re-released by POPS Kids on digital platforms and YouTube with a Vietnamese dub version by Purpose Media from 2018 and 2022.

Home media 
The 1981 anime series was released on two, nine-disc DVD box sets by Columbia Music Entertainment in Japan. The first box set was released on August 31, 2005, while the second was released on November 2 that same year.

The Japanese dub of the 2012 series was released on a five-disc DVD box set, under the title Ninja Hattori-kun Returns (忍者ハットリくんリターンズ), by TC Entertainment, Inc. on July 11, 2014 in Japan.

Live-action film 
A live-action film entitled Nin x Nin: Ninja Hattori-kun, the Movie was released in 2004.

See also
 Doraemon
 Hattori Hanzō

References

External links 
 
 Ninja Hattori at Nick India
 Ninja Hattori at LUK Internacional
 Ninja Hattori-kun at Shin-Ei Animation
 Ninja Hattori-kun at TV Asahi
 Ninja Hattori-kun at Animax Japan

 
1964 anime television series debuts
1964 manga
1966 Japanese television series debuts 
1968 Japanese television series endings 
1981 anime television series debuts
1981 manga
1982 anime films
1983 anime films
1984 anime films
1985 anime films
2013 anime television series debuts
2013 Indian television series debuts
Children's animated films
Children's film series
Japanese film series
Japanese adult animated action television series
Japanese adult animated comedy television series
Japanese adult animated films
Japanese children's animated action television series
Japanese children's animated comedy television series
Japanese children's films
Ninja in anime and manga
Shin-Ei Animation
Shogakukan manga
Shogakukan franchises
Shōnen manga
Fujiko Fujio A
TV Asahi original programming
Nickelodeon (Indian TV channel) original programming
Animated television series by Netflix
Japanese-language Netflix original programming
Hindi-language Netflix original programming
English-language Netflix original programming